Mali Korinj is a small village in the hills south of Krka in the Municipality of Ivančna Gorica in central Slovenia. The area is part of the historical region of Lower Carniola. The municipality is now included in the Central Slovenia Statistical Region.

Church

The local church is dedicated to Saint George and belongs to the Parish of Krka. It is an older building that was thoroughly rebuilt in the 19th century.

References

External links

Mali Korinj on Geopedia

Populated places in the Municipality of Ivančna Gorica